Pen and Paper may refer to:

 "Pen and Paper" (Jerry Lee Lewis song), 1963
 "Pen & Paper", a 2009 song by The Red Jumpsuit Apparatus
 Pen and Paper, a 1965 album by Faron Young

See also 
 Paper-and-pencil game
 Pen-and-paper role-playing game